The Bartel BM 6 was a Polish biplane trainer fighter aircraft of 1930. It did not advance beyond the prototype stage.

Design and development
The aircraft was designed by Ryszard Bartel in the Samolot factory in Poznań, as a trainer-fighter plane. The BM-6 prototype, designated BM 6a, was flown on 8 April 1930 in Poznań. Its advantage was an easy construction and maintenance, according to Bartel's design philosophy. A distinguishing feature of all Bartels was an upper wing of a shorter span, because lower and upper wing halves were interchangeable (i.e. the lower wingspan included the fuselage width). It first introduced a mixed construction to Bartel's designs.

After trials, the prototype was modified in July 1930. The prototype was later redesignated BM 6a/II after it was substantially modified. It offered quite good flight characteristics and was capable of aerobatic flight. It was demonstrated in a fighter-plane competition in Bucharest in 1930, along with the similar PZL P.1.

The second prototype BM 6b, with a Wright Whirlwind 220 hp radial engine, was ordered, but work upon it ceased with closure of the Samolot factory in mid-1930. The PWS works, which inherited many of Samolot's projects, did not continue the project, for it had its own similar design, the PWS-11.

Description
Mixed construction biplane. Steel framed fuselage, rectangular in cross-section, canvas covered (engine and upper sections - aluminum covered). Rectangular two-spar wings with rounded ends, plywood and canvas covered. Upper wing span: 7.36 m, lower wing span: 8.10 m. Lower and upper wing halves were interchangeable. Single pilot, sitting in open cockpit, with a windshield. The V8 engine Hispano-Suiza 8Be was modified to lower power output (from 220 hp to 180 hp). Radiator below the fuselage. Fixed landing gear, with a rear skid. Two-blade wooden propeller of fixed pitch. Fuel tank in fuselage: 168 L capacity.

Operational history
After state trials in 1931, the prototype was used in an advanced training school in Grudziądz, then in an aviation training center in Dęblin.

Operators

Polish Air Force (single prototype)

Specifications (BM 6a)

See also

References

Further reading

External links
Photos and drawings
Ugolok Neba site (in Russian)

BM 6
Single-engined tractor aircraft
Biplanes
1930s Polish military trainer aircraft
Aircraft first flown in 1930